Aya Mikami (三上彩 Mikami Aya, born January 27, 1984) is a Japanese volleyball player who plays for Hisamitsu Springs.

Clubs
FurukawaShogyo High School → Tsukuba Univ. → Hisamitsu Springs (2006-)

National team
 Universiade national team (2005)

Honours
Team
Japan Volleyball League/V.League/V.Premier　Champions (1): 2006-07
Kurowashiki All Japan Volleyball Championship　Champions (2): 2006,2007
Empress' Cup 　Runners-up (1): 2007

References

External links
Hisamitsu Springs Official Site 

Japanese women's volleyball players
1984 births
Living people